Francis Yip may refer to:

 Frances Yip (born 1947), Hong Kong actress
 Francis Ching-wah Yip (born 1967), Hong Kong theologian
 Françoise Yip (born 1972), Chinese-Canadian actress